Middle Pillar Presents is a New York-based record label that specializes in ambient, gothic, and experimental music. The label began as distributor for other labels and artists entitled Middle Pillar Distribution. Kevin Dunn and James Babbo established Middle Pillar Presents to showcase artists unable to get signed elsewhere. The British independent label 4AD served as an inspiration to the founding of Middle Pillar Presents. Middle Pillar Presents was established with the goal of releasing only "dark" music. In an effort to maintain musical continuity the sub-label Hell's Hundred Records was established to sign bands of other styles, such as "punk, gothic horror rock, [and] psychobilly."

Roster

Middle Pillar Presents
 Aenima
 A Murder of Angels
 The Changelings
 Kobe
 Loretta's Doll
 The Machine in the Garden
 Mirabilis
 The Mirror Reveals
 Sumerland
 Thread
 The Unquiet Void
 Zoar

Hell's Hundred Records
 The Brides
 The Empire Hideous
 Mister Monster

References

External links
 Official Middle Pillar Presents website
 Official Hell's Hundred Records website
 

Record labels established in 1998
American independent record labels
Electronic music record labels
Companies based in New York (state)
Horror punk record labels